Democratic Way is a legal Hoxhaist Marxist-Leninist political party in Morocco led by Mustapha Brahma and includes former members of the heavily repressed Moroccan Communist Party and the Marxist-Leninist Moroccan Movement.

Democratic Way has boycotted all the elections held since its creation as they do not consider them to be free, deeming them to be "democratic smokescreen" for the Moroccan royal regime.

History and profile
Since 2004, when the party was legalized by the Moroccan State, its Secretary General is Mustapha Brahma who has succeeded  Abdallah El Harif. since July 2012. The party has around 50 local sections in Morocco, as well as European branches for Moroccan immigrants in Spain, France, Italy and Belgium.

Constituted in 1995 by members of the clandestine organization "Ila Al Amame" (Forward), integrated also sympathizers of the Marxist–Leninist Moroccan movement (MLMM). Ila Al-Amam, created in 1970 by dissidents of the short-lived Party of Liberation and Socialism (former Moroccan Communist Party), was the object of heavy repression by the Moroccan authorities; thousands of militants were imprisoned (the majority receiving ten-year prison sentences); others, such as Abdellatif Zeroual, one of the founders of Ila Al Amame, died in torture centres or during the hunger strikes started in prison in order to take advantage of their rights (Saida Menebhi for example); others disappeared without the truth on their fate being known.

The first national congress of the Democratic Way was held on 16 to 18 July 2004, whereas that of the youth of the Democratic Way ("Chabibat Annahj Addimocrati") was held on 22 to 24 December 2006 at the Mehdi Ben Barka Hall of Rabat. The second congress was held in July 2008, and the third national congress of the party is scheduled for 13, 14 and 15 July 2012 in Casablanca.

In 2004 the party formed an alliance with Loyalty to Democracy party, the Unified Socialist Left (GSU), the Party of the Socialist Vanguard (PADS), and the National Ittihad Congress (CNI).

The main objective of the Democratic Way is the construction of socialism, with a democratic society that put an end to capitalism and the human exploitation. The party criticize the "illusions of alternance", referring to the presence of the Socialist Union of Popular Forces, until then the main opposition party, at the 1998 Moroccan government. Democratic Way had boycotted all the elections held since its creation (as other Moroccan parties had done in the past, for example the National Union of Popular Forces between 1972 and 2005), as they do not consider then free, neither the Moroccan regime as democratic.

The Democratic Way is present in a number of causes, movements and struggles:
Their presence in the trade unions, committees for defending public social services or supporting social struggles, the unemployed university graduates movement, etc. ... , fighting against "savage liberalism" (privatization, liberalization, deregulation ... )
The implication of its militants on the Moroccan human rights movement, opposing the human rights violations of the regime.
The struggle for democracy, denouncing the actual "façade democracy" through active campaigning for the boycott of elections, and reclaiming free and honest elections, with the base of a democratic constitution made by a Constitutive Assembly
The struggle against Moroccan dependence, cutting military (joint military exercises, NATO reunions, cooperation against "terrorism" ... ), policy and economic (Greater Middle East, Morocco–United States Free Trade Agreement, the proposed Morocco-UE Free Trade Agreement, Mediterranean Union ... ) relations with imperialism.
The struggle for recognition of the Amazigh language and culture as official, and give the regions with Amazigh majorities the maximum autonomy.
The support of the people's struggles, and above them the Palestinian, Iraqi and Lebanese people's, and the struggle "against the normalization with the Zionist entity".
The support to the Sahrawi people struggle for self-determination, direct negotiations between Morocco and the Polisario Front and peaceful solutions.

Since its first appearances, Democratic Way had supported the demonstrations of the February 20 Movement. In April 2011, Democratic Way rejected the official formula for reforming the Moroccan constitution, and called for the strengthening and consolidation of mobilization and to continue the struggle for a democratic regime.

The militants of Democratic Way are present in the two principal trade unions in Morocco (the Moroccan Union of Workers - UMT, and the Democratic Confederation of Work - CDT), as well as non-governmental organisations such as the Moroccan Association for Human Rights, Attac-Morocco, the National Association of Unemployed Graduates in Morocco (ANDCM) and the women rights movement.

The Democratic Way commemorate every 5 December, the "Day of the Martyrs", remembering members of Il Al-Amame killed by security forces and the ones who died in prison by torture or in hunger strikes during the "Years of Lead" of Hassan II.

References

External links

1995 establishments in Morocco
Anti-imperialist organizations
Anti-revisionist organizations
Communist parties in Morocco
Political parties established in 1995
Political parties in Morocco
Republicanism in Morocco
Hoxhaist parties